Zinc finger protein OZF is a protein that in humans is encoded by the ZNF146 gene.

See also
 Zinc finger

References

Further reading

External links 
 

Transcription factors